Chhipa Welfare Association, commonly known as Chhipa, is a Pakistani non-profit welfare organization founded in 2007 by Ramzan Chhipa. It is headquartered in Karachi, Pakistan.

The 1987 Karachi car bombing at Bohri Bazaar led Ramzan Chhipa to found Chhipa Welfare Association.

Its stated mission is a strong commitment to serving the people without discrimination of any caste, creed or colour under all circumstances, where frequent road accidents, sudden events, and emergencies occur daily. The Chhipa Welfare Association is a non-governmental organization in Pakistan. Its activities include financial aid and free or low-cost food to people with low income. The general public, philanthropists and the business community supports this organization with their donations.

The services include:
 Chhipa Ambulance Service
 Chhipa Dastarkhawan
Chhipa Orphanage
 Chhipa Home
 Chhipa Morgue
 Chhipa Kitchen 
 Chhipa Monthly Ration Bag
 Chhipa Ritual Bathing Room
 Chhipa Free Ghusal & Kaffan
 Chhipa Mobile Morgue
 Chhipa Graveyard
 Chhipa Jhoola
 Chhipa Newborn Home
 Chhipa Old Home
 Chhipa Women Shelter Home

Activities

Ambulances
The Chhipa Welfare Association runs a number of ambulance centres in Karachi. The ambulances are basic vans with room for a stretcher, for transportation to a hospital but without any medical staff in the ambulance.

CHHIPA AMBULANCE. The humanitarian services of Chhipa Welfare Association, with a large fleet of dedicated fleet of ambulances, staffed by paramedics and equipped with a first aid box and an oxygen cylinder, spread over Chhipa Ambulance Emergency Centres located at prominent places, at various road roundabouts and near hospitals across the city of Karachi and other regions of Pakistan, on alert––around the clock all year around––for providing immediate help and assistance to the needy, the seriously injured victims of road accidents, train collisions, disasters and calamities, shifting the sick and emergency patients, rushing them to hospitals and medical facilities.

While the responding time is within 05 minutes, which further initiates the rescue operation without any delay.

Normally, Chhipa Ambulances––24 hours/7 days a week––remain engaged on roads in lifting and shifting the seriously injured victims of road accidents, the needy, the sick, burnt out and severed body parts, emergency patients, partially decomposed and unidentified, decomposed and mutilated bodies, lying in drains and sewers, dead bodies––to hospitals & medical centres in attempts to save the valuable human lives, all taken care off by Chhipa Volunteers.

Palna
The association provides a means for people who are unable to care for their newborn children to give them up for adoption, as an alternative to abandoning the child, and to lessen the risk of infanticide. The ambulance centers include a palna (lit. "cradle") where people can leave their babies; the Chhipa Association can then arrange for the infant to be adopted.

Social worker Ramzan Chhipa is the first legal guardian until after a married childless couple is handed the infant for adoption. Chhipa Welfare Association maintains the complete record and the legality of all such unwanted children that are placed in Chhipa Jhoola. After the married childless couple has been selected, the child is then handed over to them in a simple adoption ceremony at the Chhipa Head Office. After that social worker Ramzan Chhipa regularly visits the homes of the adopting parents and monitors the well-being and upbringing of the adopted child.

Sacrificial animals
The ambulance centers also accept animals that have been sacrificed on the occasion of a child's birth (Aqiqah) or as other forms of voluntary charity (Sadaqah). These sacrifices are prepared as food for people with low-income.

Monthly Ration Programme 
Chhipa Welfare gives priority to ensure their provisions of food, clothing and education and provides these deserving families with Chhipa Monthly Ration. Also, maintaining the respect for their self-esteem.

Home & Orphanage 
This welfare association provides the free home & orphanage.

 CHHIPA HOME FOR NEWBORN
 CHHIPA ORPHANAGE
 CHHIPA OLD HOME
 CHHIPA WOMEN SHELTER.

Awards 
 On 23 March 2013, Sindh Governor Dr Ishrat Ul Ebad Khan conferred Sitara-e-Imtiaz (Star of Excellence) to Ramzan Chhipa for his social welfare work.
 On 22 June 2013, Ramzan Chhipa received the Gold Medal by the Federation of Pakistan Chambers of Commerce & Industry (FPCCI) Achievement Award for his work with the Chhipa Welfare Association.
 Honorary Doctor of Letters degree by the University of Karachi and Governor of Sindh for his Social Welfare Services in 2014.

References

External links 

Welfare agencies
Organisations based in Karachi
Social welfare charities based in Pakistan
Humanitarian aid organizations
Ambulance services in Pakistan